The Pam O'Neill Stakes, registered as the Glenlogan Park Stakes, is a Brisbane Racing Club Group 3 Thoroughbred horse race for fillies and mares, run under Set Weights with penalties conditions over a distance of 1600 metres at Eagle Farm Racecourse, Brisbane, Australia during the Queensland Winter Racing Carnival.  Total prizemoney is A$150,000.

History

The race was inaugurated in 1985 as the Rosemount Wines Stakes. Since its first running the race has had many name changes but since 2002 the name has been the Glenlogan Park Stakes.Ortensia won this race in 2009 before pursuing successful overseas campaigns in Dubai and in England.

Name
 1985–1986 - Rosemount Wines Stakes
 1987–1988 - Orlando Wines Stakes
 1989 - Minister for Transport Stakes
 1990 - QBBS Breeders' Stakes
 1991 - QBBS Stakes
 1992 - Michaels Restaurant Stakes
 1993–1995 - The Original Tastee Pies Stakes
 1996–1998 - Diamond Stud Stakes
 1999–2000 - Glenlogan Park Stakes
 2001 - Lady Of The Turf Stakes
 2002–2018 - Glenlogan Park Stakes
 2019 - Grinders Coffee Roasters Stakes
 2020 - Sapphire Stakes
 2021 onwards - Pam O'Neill Stakes

Grade
1985–2009 -  Listed Race
2010 onwards - Group 3

Conditions
prior 2005 - Handicap
2005–2006 - Quality handicap
2007 onwards - Set weights with penalties

Distance
prior to 2016 – 1350 metres
2017 – 1300 metres
2018 – 1350 metres
2019 – 1300 metres

Venue
prior to 2016 - Doomben Racecourse
2017 - Eagle Farm Racecourse
2018 - Doomben Racecourse
2019 - Eagle Farm Racecourse

Winners

 2022 - Tycoon Evie
 2021 - Nudge
 2020 - Sure Knee
 2019 - Savatiano
2018 - Pedrena
2017 - Eckstein
2016 - Ghisoni
2015 - Peace Force
2014 - Srikandi
2013 - Sookie
2012 - Wealth Princess
2011 - Kanzan
2010 - Wealth Princess
2009 - Ortensia   
2008 - Quizzical Lady                    
2007 - Storm Signal                      
2006 - Countess Bathory                      
2005 - Beautiful Gem                     
2004 - Martique                            
2003 - Suzy Grey                               
2002 - Paris Heartbeat                       
2001 - Classic Cliche 
2000 - Stella Maree 
1999 - Chiming Lass 
1998 - Razor Blade 
1997 - Timeless Winds 
1996 - Amber 
1995 - Mamzelle Pedrille  
1994 - Seawinne 
1993 - Rich Pageantry
1992 - Blushing Bijou
1991 - Morning Lover
1990 - Our Today
1989 - La Posette
1988 - Marmie's Girl
1987 - Call Me Biddy
1986 - Dame Du Siecle
1985 - Princess Tiber

‡ Not held due to the COVID-19 pandemic

See also
 List of Australian Group races
 Group races

References

Horse races in Australia
Mile category horse races for fillies and mares
Sport in Brisbane